is the 17th studio album by Japanese singer-songwriter Miyuki Nakajima, released in November 1989. Like some of her previous efforts (Okaerinasai and Oiro Naoshi), it comprises the materials that she wrote for other singers.

The album features three top-ten hit singles. Among them, "Haru Nanoni" was recorded by pop idol Yoshie Kashiwabara in 1983. It became Kashiwabara's most successful single after her breakthrough "Hello Goodbye", peaking at No. 6 on the Japanese Oricon chart. Nakajima's contribution won the 25th Japan Record Awards for the "Best Songwriting Prize". "Lonely Canary" is one of Kashiwabara's subsequent materials written by Nakajima, released in 1985 and charted at No. 9. The lead-off track, "Kōsa ni Fukarete," was recorded by Shizuka Kudō and released as a single 2 months before Kaikinetsu came out. Nakajima had previously contributed the lyrics for her records, including two chart toppers "Fu-Ji-Tsu" and "Mu-Go,n...Iroppoi". "Kōsa ni Fukarete" also reached the summit of the Oricon shortly after its release, becoming the fifth of Kudo's eight consecutive No. 1 hit singles. In Japan, it became one of the biggest hits of 1989 with sales of over 580,000 copies, winning the 4th RIAJ Gold Disc Awards for "The Best Five Singles of Year" category.

Following the smash hit single interpreted by Kudo, Kaikinetsu sold better than other Nakajima's albums released in the late 1980s. On the Japanese Oricon Year-end chart of 1990, it was placed at the 99th best-selling album.

Track listing
All songs arranged by Ichizō Seo

Personnel
Hideo Yamaki – drums
Eiji Shimamura – drums
Jun Aoyama – drums
Yūichi Tokashiki – drums
Chiharu Mikuzuki – bass guitar
Kenji Takamizu – bass guitar
Tsugutoshi Goto – bass guitar
Yasuo Arakawa – wood bass
Tsuyoshi Kon – electric guitar
Masaki Matsubara – electric guitar
Hideo Saito – electric guitar
Ryōmei Shirai – electric guitar
Kiyoshi Sugimoto – electric guitar
Chuei Yoshikawa – acoustic guitar, flat mandolin
Nobuo Kurata – keyboards
Yasuharu Nakanishi – keyboards
Ken Shima – keyboards
Elton Nagata – keyboards
Hideo Ichikawa – keyboards
Yasuhiro Kobayashi – accordion
Aska Group – strings
Joe Group – strings
Sakurako Shirahama – violin
Kouzou Noguchi – bassoon
Masashi Togame – clarinet
Toshihiko Furumura – alto sax
Nobuhiko Nakayama – computer programming
Tatsuhiko Mori – computer programming
Keishi Urata – computer programming
Yuiko Tsubokura – backing vocals
Kazuyo Sugimoto – backing vocals
Ichizō Seo – backing vocals, keyboards, computer programming
Miyuki Nakajima – lead and backing vocals

Chart positions

References

1989 albums
Miyuki Nakajima albums
Pony Canyon albums
Self-covers albums